Tsutsui Station may refer to:
 Tsutsui Station (Aomori), a railway station in Aomori Prefecture, Japan
 Tsutsui Station (Nara), a railway station in Nara Prefecture, Japan